Bhopalrao Bissuli was an Indian politician from the state of the Madhya Pradesh. In the 1957 Madhya Pradesh Legislative Assembly election he was the Indian National Congress candidate for the Kurud constituency of the undivided Madhya Pradesh Legislative Assembly and won the seat.

References 

Madhya Pradesh MLAs 1957–1962
People from Dhamtari district
Year of birth missing
Possibly living people
Indian National Congress politicians from Chhattisgarh
Indian National Congress politicians from Madhya Pradesh